Jørn Lier Horst (born 27 February 1970) is a Norwegian author of crime fiction and a former Senior Investigating Officer at Vestfold police district. His books have been published in over 40 countries and have sold more than ten million copies.
Horst made his writing debut in 2004 with Key Witness, based on a true murder story. The detective character in his crime novels is William Wisting, and a television series based on the series premiered in 2019. He has also written children's books, including a series named Clue and books about Detective agency no. 2.

Personal life
Horst was born in Bamble, Telemark, the younger of two brothers. His parents were Oddvar and Hildur Lier Olsen. In 1995 he married Beate Horst and now uses her surname. They live in Stavern with their two children.

Bibliography

William Wisting series
 Key Witness (Org. Nøkkelvitnet, 2004)
 Disappearance of Felicia (Org. Felicia forsvant, 2005)
 When the Sea Calms (Org. Når havet stilner, 2006)
 The Only One (Org. Den eneste ene, 2007)
 The Night Man (Org. Nattmannen, 2009) - translated into English July 2022
 Dregs (Org. Bunnfall, 2010) - translated into English by Anne Bruce, 2011
 Closed for Winter (Org. Vinterstengt, 2011) - translated into English 2013
 The Hunting Dogs (Org. Jakthundene, 2012) - translated into English 2014
 The Caveman (Org. Hulemannen, 2013) -  translated into English 2015
 Ordeal (Org. Blindgang, 2015) - translated into English 2016
 When It Grows Dark (Org. Når Det Mørkner, 2016) - translated into English 2016 (A prequel to the series.)
 The Katharina Code (Org. Katharina-koden, 2017) - translated into English 2018
 The Cabin (Org. Det innerste rommet, 2018) - translated into English 2019
 The Inner Darkness (Org. Illvilje, 2019)- translated into English 2020
 A Question of Guilt (Org. Sak 1569, 2020)- translated into English 2021
 Boundless (Org. Grenseløs, 2021)
 The traitor (Org. Forræderen, 2022)

Children's books
Detective Agency no. 2 series
 Operasjon Tordensky (2013)
 Operasjon Mørkemann (2013)
 Operasjon Solnedgang (2013)
 Operasjon Påskelilje (2014)
 Operasjon Sommerøya (2014)
 Operasjon Vindkast (2014)
 Operasjon Bronseplass (2015)
 Jakten på Kaptein Kroghs gull (2015)
 Operasjon Plastpose (2015)
 Operasjon Sirkus (2016)
 Jakten på Jungelens Dronning (2016)
 Operasjon Spøkelse (2016)
 Operasjon Sjørøver (2017)
 Jakten på Tyven-tyven (2017)
 Operasjon Mumie (2017)
 Detektivhåndboken (2017)
 Operasjon Skipsvrak (2018)
 Jakten på slottets hemmelighet (2018)
 Operasjon Skrotnisse (2018)
 Operasjon Svartskog (2019)
 Jakten på Trollmannens bok (2019)
 Operasjon Radius (2019)
 Operasjon Lurifaks (2020)

Clue series
 Salamandergåten (2012) (The Salamander Mystery)
 Maltsergåten (2012) (The Maltese Mystery)
 Undervannsgåten (2013) (The Underwater Mystery)
 Gravrøvergåten (2013) (The Grave Robbing Mystery)
 Libertygåten (2014) (The Liberty Mystery)
 Esmeraldgåten (2014) (The Emeralda Mystery)
 Rivertongåten (2014) (The Riverton Mystery)
 Hodeskallegåten (2016) (The Skull Mystery)
 Ulvehundgåten (2016) (The Wolfhound Mystery)
 Sjøormgåten (2017) (The Sea Serpent Mystery)
 Einsteingåten (2017) (The Einstein Mystery)
 Triangelgåten (2018) (The Triangle Mystery)
 Smuglerhuset (2019) (The Smuggler’s Shack)

Awards and honours
2010 The Riverton Prize shortlist for Dregs (no)

2011 The Riverton Prize shortlist for Closed for Winter (no)

2011 The Norwegian Booksellers' Prize for Closed for Winter (no)

2011 Vestfold Literature Prize (no)

2012 The Riverton Prize for The Hunting Dogs (no)

2012 Ark’s Children's Book award shortlist for The Salamander mystery (no)

2013 The Norwegian Booksellers' Prize shortlist for The Hunting dogs (no)

2013 The Glass Key award for The Hunting Dogs (nordic)

2013 The Norwegian Booksellers' Prize shortlist for The Caveman (no)

2016 The Petrona Award for The Caveman (uk)

2014 The Martin Beck Award for The Hunting Dogs (swe)

2015 Ark’s Book of the Year shortlist for Ordeal (no)

2016 The Bokslukerprisen award shortlist for The Riverton Mystery (no)

2016 Special Award for Excellence in Crime Fiction Writing (PL)

2016 The Petrona Award for The Caveman (uk)

2017 The Bokslukerprisen award shortlist for The Wolfhound Mystery (no)

2017 BOK365 Book of the Year shortlist for The Katharina code (no)

2017 CWA International Dagger longlist for When it grows dark (uk)

2018 Grand Prix de Littérature Policière shortlist for The Hunting dogs (fr)

2018 BOK365 Book of the Year shortlist for The Cabin (no)

2018 The Nordic Noir Thriller of the Year Award for Dregs (nordic)

2019 Grand Prix de Littérature Policière shortlist for The Caveman (fr)

2019 CWA International Dagger longlist for The Katharina Code (uk)

2019 BOK365 Book of the Year shortlist for The Inner Darkness (no)

2019 The Petrona Award for The Katharina Code (uk)

2020 The Edgar Award shortlist for The Wisting tv-series (us)

2020 CWA International Dagger longlist for The Cabin (uk)

2020 The Petrona Award shortlist for The Cabin (uk)

2021 Prix du Bureau des Lecteurs shortlist for Ordeal (fr)

2021 Vrij Nederland’s Thriller of the Year shortlist for The Katharina Code (nl)

2021 The Petrona Award shortlist for Death Deserved (uk)

2021 The Beech Book Award shortlist for A Question of Guilt (no)

References

External links
 
 

1970 births
Living people
People from Bamble
Norwegian crime fiction writers
Nordic Noir writers